The 2019 Hall of Fame Open was a men's tennis tournament played on outdoor grass courts. It was the 44th edition of the event, and part of the 250 series of the 2019 ATP Tour. It took place at the International Tennis Hall of Fame in Newport, Rhode Island, United States, from July 15 through July 21, 2019.

Singles main draw entrants

Seeds

 1 Rankings are as of July 1, 2019

Other entrants 
The following players received wildcards into the singles main draw:
  Christopher Eubanks
  Alastair Gray
  John Isner

The following players received entry from the qualifying draw:
  Alex Bolt
  Ramkumar Ramanathan
  Tim Smyczek
  Viktor Troicki

ATP doubles main draw entrants

Seeds 

 Rankings are as of July 1, 2019

Other entrants 
The following pairs received wildcards into the doubles main draw:
 Maxime Cressy /  Keegan Smith 
 Tennys Sandgren /  Max Schnur

Champions

Singles 

  John Isner def.  Alexander Bublik, 7–6(7–2), 6–3

Doubles 

 Marcel Granollers /  Sergiy Stakhovsky def.  Marcelo Arévalo /  Miguel Ángel Reyes-Varela, 6–7(10–12), 6–4, [13–11]

References

External links